Henry Paoli Leavens (1836–1917) was a member of the Wisconsin State Assembly during the 1877 session. Other positions he held include village president and town chairman (positions similar to mayor), alderman, board of education (similar to school board) member and county supervisor. He was a Republican.

Leavens was born on June 4, 1836, in Berkshire, Vermont and died March 17, 1917, in Neenah, Wisconsin.

References

1836 births
1917 deaths
People from Berkshire, Vermont
Politicians from Neenah, Wisconsin
Mayors of places in Wisconsin
Wisconsin city council members
County supervisors in Wisconsin
School board members in Wisconsin
Republican Party members of the Wisconsin State Assembly